Neri Marcorè (born 31 July 1966) is an Italian actor, voice actor, impressionist, television presenter and singer. He has appeared in 22 films and television shows since 1994. He starred in the film Incantato, which was entered into the 2003 Cannes Film Festival.

Selected filmography
 Incantato (2003)
 La seconda notte di nozze (2005)
 Pope John Paul I: The Smile of God (2006)
 Lessons in Chocolate (2007)
 I mostri oggi (2009)
 The Friends at the Margherita Cafe (2009)
 The Tourist (2010)
 Tous les soleils (2011)
 Asterix and Obelix: God Save Britannia (2012)
 I Can Quit Whenever I Want (2014)
 A Holy Venetian Family (2015)
 I Can Quit Whenever I Want: Ad Honorem (2017)

References

External links

Neri Marcorè website

1966 births
Living people
Italian male film actors
Italian male voice actors
Italian male singers
Italian impressionists (entertainers)
Nastro d'Argento winners
20th-century Italian male actors
21st-century Italian male actors
People from Sant'Elpidio a Mare